The 2009–10 Austrian Football First League (German: Erste Liga, also known as ADEG Erste Liga due to sponsorship) was the 36th season of the Austrian second-level football league. It began on 14 July 2009 and ended on 28 May 2010.

The season is the last one played with twelve teams, as league size will be reduced to ten for 2010–11. The reserve teams of Austrian Bundesliga clubs Red Bull Salzburg and Austria Vienna will be demoted to the Regionalliga after the season regardless of their final position. The last-placed of the remaining ten teams will also be relegated, while the team ranked ninth will compete with the Regionalliga champions for another spot in the 2010–11 season.

Team movements

Movement between Bundesliga and Erste Liga
SC Wiener Neustadt as 2008–09 champions were promoted to the Bundesliga. They were replaced by SC Rheindorf Altach, who finished the 2008–09 Bundesliga season in last place.

Movement between Erste Liga and Regionalliga
SV Grödig, DSV Leoben and 1. FC Vöcklabruck finished the 2008–09 season in the bottom three places and were relegated to their appropriate Regionalliga division. The three relegated teams were replaced by Regionalliga division champions First Vienna (East), TSV Hartberg (Central) and FC Dornbirn 1913 (West).

Team overview

League table

Season statistics

Top scorers

Source: Weltfussball.de
Updated: 26 February 2010

External links
 Official site

2. Liga (Austria) seasons
Austria
2009–10 in Austrian football